The 2010 Whyte & Mackay Premier League was a darts tournament organised by the Professional Darts Corporation; the sixth such running of the tournament.

The tournament began at The O2 Arena in London on 11 February, and finished at the Wembley Arena on 24 May.

Phil Taylor won in the final 10–8 against defending champion James Wade, where he also became the first player to hit two nine-dart finishes in a single match.

Qualification
The top six players from the PDC Order of Merit following the 2010 PDC World Darts Championship were confirmed on 5 January. Simon Whitlock and Adrian Lewis were named as the two Sky Sports wild card selections; Whitlock being announced on 4 January and Lewis on 13 January.

WC = Wild Card

Venues
Fifteen venues were used for the 2010 Premier League, with the only change from 2009 being Bournemouth replacing Edinburgh after a one-year absence.

Prize money
The prize money increased again with the total prize fund rising to £410,000, as a third place play-off was introduced, earning the winner of that an extra £10,000 to their £40,000 for reaching the play-offs.

Results

League stage

11 February – week 1
 The O2 Arena, London

18 February – week 2
 Bournemouth International Centre, Bournemouth

25 February – week 3
 Odyssey Arena, Belfast

4 March – Week 4
 Westpoint Arena, Exeter

11 March – Week 5
 MEN Arena, Manchester

18 March – Week 6
 Brighton Centre, Brighton

25 March – Week 7
 National Indoor Arena, Birmingham

1 April – Week 8
 Cardiff International Arena, Cardiff

8 April – Week 9
 SECC, Glasgow

15 April – week 10
 Sheffield Arena, Sheffield

22 April – week 11
 Echo Arena, Liverpool

29 April – week 12
 AECC, Aberdeen

Nine-dart finish
The Premier League's second nine-dart finish occurred, when Raymond van Barneveld hit one during the second leg of his match against Terry Jenkins, checking out with T20, T19 and D12. Barneveld had also hit the first Premier League nine-dart finish in 2006 against Peter Manley.

6 May – week 13
 Metro Radio Arena, Newcastle upon Tyne

13 May – week 14
 Trent FM Arena, Nottingham

Play-offs – 24 May
 Wembley Arena, London

 The play-offs were originally scheduled for 23 May, but due to a power cut in the area surrounding the Wembley Arena, they were postponed until 24 May.

Nine dart finishes
The finals night saw the second and third nine-dart finishes of the 2010 Premier League Darts, and the third and fourth in Premier League Darts overall, in the final between Phil Taylor and James Wade.

Trailing 1–0 after losing the throw in the first leg, Taylor responded with a 174 (T20, 2 T19s), 180 (3 T20s), and 147 (T20, T17, D18) to take the second leg against throw. This was Taylor's first nine-dart finish in the Premier League, having only been achieved previously by Raymond van Barneveld. This was also the first nine-dart finish in a televised final.

In the 15th leg he hit the second nine dart finish of the night with two 180s and checked out on 141 (T20, T19, D12). This was the first time that the same player achieved two nine dart finishes in one match. After the second nine darter, Taylor made it 17 consecutive perfect darts, needing only T17 D18 for a 3rd nine darter and second on the trot, he missed the T17 by an inch, but still went on to win that leg in 10 darts, after then hitting T18, then returning to hit the D8 with his first dart.

Table and streaks

Table

Top four qualified for Play-offs after Week 14.NB: LWAT = Legs Won Against Throw. Players separated by +/- leg difference if tied.

Streaks

NB: W = Won
D = Drawn
L = Lost

Player statistics
The following statistics are for the league stage only. Playoffs are not included.

Phil Taylor
Longest unbeaten run: 14
Most consecutive wins: 4
Most consecutive draws: 1
Most consecutive losses: 0
Longest without a win: 1
Biggest victory: 8-1 (v. Adrian Lewis)
Biggest defeat: Player Undefeated

Simon Whitlock
Longest unbeaten run: 3
Most consecutive wins: 2
Most consecutive draws: 1
Most consecutive losses: 1
Longest without a win: 2
Biggest victory: 8-2 (v. Mervyn King)
Biggest defeat: 3-8 (v. Phil Taylor)

James Wade
Longest unbeaten run: 4
Most consecutive wins: 2
Most consecutive draws: 2
Most consecutive losses: 3
Longest without a win: 5
Biggest victory: 8-3 (v. Raymond van Barneveld)
Biggest defeat: 2-8 (v. Phil Taylor)

Mervyn King
Longest unbeaten run: 3
Most consecutive wins: 2
Most consecutive draws: 2
Most consecutive losses: 3
Longest without a win: 3
Biggest victory: 8-2 (v. Terry Jenkins)
Biggest defeat: 1-8 (v. Phil Taylor)

Ronnie Baxter
Longest unbeaten run: 3
Most consecutive wins: 2
Most consecutive draws: 2
Most consecutive losses: 1
Longest without a win: 6
Biggest victory: 8-4 (v. Raymond van Barneveld)
Biggest defeat: 2-8 (v. Raymond van Barneveld)

Raymond van Barneveld
Longest unbeaten run: 2
Most consecutive wins: 2
Most consecutive draws: 1
Most consecutive losses: 5
Longest without a win: 6
Biggest victory: 8-2 (v. Ronnie Baxter)
Biggest defeat: 2-8 (v. Phil Taylor (twice))

Adrian Lewis
Longest unbeaten run: 2
Most consecutive wins: 2
Most consecutive draws: 2
Most consecutive losses:2
Longest without a win: 5
Biggest victory: 8-3 (v. Raymond van Barneveld)
Biggest defeat: 1-8 (v. Phil Taylor)

Terry Jenkins
Longest unbeaten run: 3
Most consecutive wins: 2
Most consecutive draws: 2
Most consecutive losses: 6
Longest without a win: 6
Biggest victory: 8-4 (v. Ronnie Baxter)
Biggest defeat: 2-8 (v. Mervyn King)

References

External links
Whyte & Mackay Premier League Darts

Premier League Darts
Premier League
Premier League Darts
Premier League Darts